Dumb and Dumber To is a 2014 American buddy comedy film co-written and directed by the Farrelly brothers. It is the third installment in the Dumb and Dumber franchise and a sequel to the 1994 film Dumb and Dumber. The film stars Jim Carrey and Jeff Daniels reprising their roles 20 years after the events of the first film, and also features Rob Riggle, Laurie Holden, Rachel Melvin, and Kathleen Turner. The film tells the story of Lloyd Christmas and Harry Dunne (played by Carrey and Daniels, respectively), two dimwitted adults who set out on a cross-country road trip to locate Harry's daughter, who has been adopted.

First announced in October 2011, Dumb and Dumber To underwent a turbulent pre-production phase which included, at one point, Carrey withdrawing from the project, and Warner Bros. Pictures refusing to distribute the film. The project was eventually taken on in 2013 by Red Granite Pictures and the film was shot later that year. Released on November 14, 2014, by Universal Pictures, the film received negative reviews from critics. It grossed $36.1 million on its opening weekend and over $169 million worldwide.

On June 15, 2017, the United States Department of Justice charged that money used to produce the film was stolen from a Malaysian government investment fund. Red Granite Pictures denied knowingly accepting stolen money. Prosecutors also filed a Forfeiture Complaint in federal court to seize the rights of ownership to Dumb and Dumber To as well as the rights to the 2015 film Daddy's Home. Red Granite later made a $60 million settlement.

Plot

For twenty years a catatonic Lloyd Christmas has been committed to a mental institution ever since he discovered Mary Swanson was already married at the end of the first film. During a visit, Lloyd's best friend Harry Dunne pleads with him to snap out of it, then discovers that Lloyd has pranked him by faking his condition the entire time.

Harry reveals he needs a kidney transplant, and learns he cannot get one from his parents because he was adopted as a baby. Harry's dad gives him his mail that has been piling up since he moved out. It includes a 1991 postcard from ex-girlfriend Fraida Felcher, stating she is pregnant and needs Harry to call. Upon contacting her, Fraida reveals that she had a daughter named Fanny, who she gave up for adoption. She once wrote Fanny a letter, only for it to be returned and instructed to never contact her again.

Hoping Fanny can provide a kidney, Lloyd and Harry drive to Oxford, Maryland, where she now lives. Dr. Bernard Pinchelow and his wife Adele are Fanny's adoptive parents. Fanny, who has taken the name Penny, is going to a KEN Convention in El Paso, Texas to give a speech on her father's life work. Bernard had wanted Penny to deliver a package to one of the convention heads but, being dim-witted, she ends up forgetting the package and her cellphone.

Adele is secretly trying to poison Bernard to have his fortune, with the help of her secret lover, family housekeeper Travis Lippincott. Harry and Lloyd arrive to inform the Pinchelows of their situation. Bernard realizes Penny forgot the package, which he says contains an invention worth billions. Adele suggests that Harry and Lloyd deliver the package to Penny. Travis accompanies them, hoping to get the box for himself and Adele. He becomes increasingly annoyed with the duo, and attempts to kill them after they pull a near death-causing prank on him, although he ends up dying in a train collision. Adele hears of the death from Travis's twin brother Captain Lippincott, a former military man who agrees to help her kill Harry and Lloyd.

The duo arrives at the convention, where Harry impersonates Bernard. They are invited to a seminar, but get into an argument when Harry discovers that Lloyd has developed a romantic attraction to Penny, having seen her photo earlier. Lloyd is escorted out of the convention due to not being on the attendance list. He gets a call from Penny and informs her that he is in town with her dad. Lloyd meets her at a restaurant and deduces that he, not Harry, is Penny's father.

Adele arrives at the convention with Lippincott and exposes Harry as a fraud, telling the convention heads that he stole the package. Fraida also arrives and triggers the fire alarm to create a diversion after she and Penny are denied entry. As the building is evacuated, Harry runs into Fraida and Penny, only to have Lippincott and Adele corner them with guns. Lloyd returns, having been to Mexico to have one of his own kidneys removed for Harry. FBI agents also bust in with Bernard, who reveals that he has been aware of Adele's plot and that his package only contains cupcakes. Fraida learns that it was Adele, not Penny, who wrote "do not contact again" on Fraida's letter. Angered by the unraveling of her scheme, Adele attempts to shoot Penny, but Harry takes the bullet for her and is injured. Adele and Lippincott are arrested.

Harry is rushed to a hospital where he reveals that he was pranking Lloyd about needing a kidney. Fraida reveals that Penny's actual biological father is not Harry or Lloyd but their deceased high school friend, Peter "Pee-Stain" Stainer. As the duo leave El Paso, they spot two women walking in their direction and shove them into a bush as a joke and yell "Bush Club". Harry and Lloyd run off and high-five each other.

Cast
 Jim Carrey as Lloyd Christmas
 Jeff Daniels as Harry Dunne
 Dalton E. Gray as Young Harry
 Rob Riggle as Travis Lippincott and Captain Lippincott
 Laurie Holden as Adele Pinchelow
 Don Lake as Doctor Roy Baker
 Kathleen Turner as Fraida Felcher
 Steve Tom as Dr. Bernard Pinchelow
 Rachel Melvin as Penny Pinchelow/Fanny Felcher, Dr. Pinchelow's adopted daughter and Fraida's biological daughter
 Tembi Locke as Dr. Walcott
 Paul Blackthorne as Emergency Room Doctor
 Brady Bluhm as Billy in 4C
 Swizz Beatz as Ninja Leader in Lloyd's fantasy sequence
 Bill Murray as Ice Pick (cameo)
 Derek Holland as patient in the asylum 
 Mama June as fantasy wife of Harry
 Cam Neely as Sea Bass

Production

Development
After months of speculation, the Farrelly brothers confirmed in October 2011 that they would make a sequel to Dumb and Dumber. The script was completed the following year in October and Jim Carrey and Jeff Daniels were expected to reprise their roles, despite Carrey having temporarily withdrawn his involvement in June due to concerns that Warner Bros. had shown little enthusiasm for the sequel. In response to these developments, Daniels said he would not do the sequel without Carrey.

Regarding the progress of the sequel, Peter Farrelly explained:

It's going well. We have a great script and now we are just trying to get it made. I love the script. It's exactly like the first one. We pick up 20 years later. We explain what they've done for the last 17 or 18 years. We take off from that and it's just a lot of laughs. It's at Warner Bros., and right now it's being financed outside the studio, but it will be released by Warner Bros. And that's all being worked out right now. If you liked Dumb and Dumber, you'll like this because it's the same and more. It's really fun. It's being made through Warner Bros. but now we have several financiers that are negotiating with the studio and trying to make the best deal. Whichever one does will make the movie. It's going to be made through Warner Bros. and released by Warner Bros. but financed by an outside financer.

Australian band Empire of the Sun composed the score for the film. In June 2013, Warner Bros. decided not to move forward with the sequel but allowed the film to be pitched to other studios. Soon after, an independent company, Red Granite Pictures, agreed to finance the sequel with a $35 million budget. Universal Pictures distributed the film in North America, the United Kingdom, Australia, Germany and Spain, while Red Granite sold the film to independent distributors. Even though Warner Bros. had no involvement in making the sequel, its New Line Cinema division, which produced the first film and its prequel, Dumb and Dumberer: When Harry Met Lloyd, was given studio credit from Universal.

Although Peter Farrelly confirmed the sequel was moving forward, a lawsuit filed by Red Granite Pictures in July sought a declaration that Red Granite owes no contractual obligation to Dumb and Dumber producers Steve Stabler and Brad Krevoy and that the duo are not entitled to any producer fees or credits they claim they're contractually owed on the sequel. In a counter claim, the producers of Dumb and Dumber accused the producers and Red Granite Pictures of racketeering. On July 18, 2014, a request for dismissal was filed in a Los Angeles Superior Court and the case was officially settled. The announcement of the settlement listed the plaintiffs as executive producers, and all claims against Red Granite, Riza Aziz and Joey McFarland of racketeering were withdrawn. The plaintiffs said in a statement: "We apologize for naming Riza Aziz and Joey McFarland as individual defendants rather than just Red Granite".

Besides Daniels and Carrey reprising their roles, Kathleen Turner was cast in the role of Fraida Felcher. Brady Bluhm reprised his role as Billy in 4C for the sequel. Farrelly brothers frequent collaborators Bennett Yellin and Mike Cerrone co-wrote the script. Screenwriting duo Sean Anders and John Morris did work on the script as well.

Although Cam Neely and Boston Bruins left winger Milan Lucic were rumored to appear in the film as Sea Bass and his son respectively, they said that they did not sign on to the film, but they were open to do so. Neely ultimately shot a scene for the film, which appears after the credits. Laurie Holden, Steve Tom, and Rachel Melvin joined the cast of the film as the Pinchelow family. Jennifer Lawrence made a cameo in the film as a younger Fraida Felcher. Lawrence has said in past interviews that she is a big fan of the original film. Some sources indicate that the scene was filmed, but cut from the film after Lawrence vetoed it, a claim denied by both the Lawrence and Farrelly camps. Bobby Farrelly explained that they tried to work around her schedule, but they were unable to do it.

The film was released on November 14, 2014.

Filming
Filming for the sequel began on September 24, 2013. Principal photography began in Atlanta and was completed on November 25.

Music
The opening credits are set to Apache Indian's song "Boom Shack-A-Lak", just like in the first film.

The soundtrack was released by WaterTower Music on November 11, 2014. Empire of the Sun recorded two new tracks for the film, and used the song "Alive" from their 2013 album Ice on the Dune. The rest of the soundtrack consists of previously recorded tracks, including a song by The Jane Carrey Band, a group led by Carrey's daughter Jane Carrey. Another song by The Jane Carrey Band included in the film, "Breathing Without You", was not included on the album itself.

Release

Marketing
In its first week, the trailer had  views on YouTube, outpacing nine other trailers, whose combined views numbered . The international trailer was released on June 25.

On August 15, Universal released two advance posters that spoofed the theatrical release poster for Lucy, another Universal-distributed release that was then in theaters. The two spoof posters, that reversed the "using more than ten percent of the brain" premise of Lucy to imply Harry and Lloyd only used one percent, were made public via Tweets from the Twitter accounts of Jim Carrey and Jeff Daniels. An official TV spot was released on September 25.

Home media
Dumb and Dumber To was released on Blu-ray and DVD on February 17, 2015.

Reception

Box office
At the end of its box office run, Dumb and Dumber To accumulated a gross of $86.2 million in North America and $83.6 million in other territories for a worldwide total of $169.8 million, against a budget of $50 million.

North America
Early analysts predicted that the film could gross around $30–32 million in its opening weekend and as high as $36–40 million in North America.

The film earned $1.6 million from Thursday night previews and $14.2 million on its opening day in Friday. The film topped the box office in its opening weekend earning $38,053,000 from 3,154 theatres at an average of $12,065 per theatre. The opening weekend gross is higher than the $16.1 million debut of the original film ($31 million adjusted for inflation), and is Carrey's biggest debut weekend since Bruce Almighty in 2003 ($67.9 million). The film played 47% under the age of 25 and 55% male. Universal distribution chief Nikki Rocco commented about the opening performance: "This was tricky to market. A lot of these kids weren't born when the first [film] came out. But it has been such a serious time in movies, we had great marketing, mindless humor, and we broadened the audience".

Outside North America
In its first weekend outside of North America, Dumb and Dumber To made over 13 million dollars. It opened number one in Brazil, Slovenia, Norway, Lebanon, South Africa, Iceland, Croatia, UAE, Uruguay. It opened number two in Poland, Austria, Colombia, Serbia, Spain, Finland, Sweden. It opened number three in Singapore, Germany, Nigeria, Netherlands, Mexico, Egypt. The largest opening was in Brazil with $3,497,325.

Outside North America, Dumb and Dumber To earned $3.2 million from four markets. The highest debut came from Germany ($1.4 million).

Critical response
On Rotten Tomatoes, the film has an approval rating of 30% based on 154 reviews, with an average rating of 4.50/10. The general consensus states, "Dumb and Dumber To does have its moments, but not enough of them—and the Farrelly brothers' brand of humor is nowhere near as refreshingly transgressive as it once seemed". On Metacritic, the film has a score of 36 out of 100, based on 36 critics, indicating "generally unfavorable reviews". Audiences surveyed by CinemaScore gave the film a grade "B−" on scale of A to F.

J. R. Jones of the Chicago Reader gave the film a positive review: "Seeing the two fiftysomething stars in their idiot haircuts again is a little disconcerting, like watching your favorite old band on a desperate reunion tour, but this sequel to Dumb & Dumber maintains a respectable laugh quotient". Colin Covert of the Star Tribune of Minnesota gave the film one out of four stars and wrote: "The result is simply stupid. This embarrassing revival plays as if the script were written in Comic Sans". Andrew Barker of Variety gave the film a negative review, noting: "Sporadically funny and mostly tedious, this 18-years-too-late sequel nonetheless exhibits a puerile purity of purpose". Joe Neumaier of New York Daily News gave the film zero out of five stars: "From junky production values to the parade of unfunny supporting characters to its lazy energy, Dumb and Dumber To falls on its face". Jason Clark of Entertainment Weekly gave the film a C−: "The ultimate sad realization is not that Dumb & Dumber To doesn't match the original's good-time quotient, but that it might not even be as good as - yikes - Dumb and Dumberer: When Harry Met Lloyd". Claudia Puig of USA Today gave the film one out of four stars: "If there was any doubt that most things in society have been dumbed down in the last couple of decades, Dumb and Dumber To could be exhibit A".

David Ehrlich of Time Out New York gave the film three out of five stars: "Dumb and Dumber To may not be quite as funny as the first one, but it's the funniest thing the Farrellys have made since". A.A. Dowd of The A.V. Club, gave the film D+ and wrote: "A sequel as desperate, in its own "official" way, as the knockoff-brand origin story that previously besmirched the franchise name". Critic Mick LaSalle of San Francisco Chronicle scored the film one out of four stars, asking: "Is this worse for Jim Carrey or Jeff Daniels? That's the sort of question that comes to mind while not laughing at Dumb and Dumber To". Manohla Dargis of The New York Times wrote that "the Farrellys are still not much interested in film as a visual medium, and when Lloyd and Harry aren't smacking each other or dropping their pants, you might as well be listening to a radio play". The Boston Globe's critic Ty Burr gave the film two-and-a-half stars out of four: "Everyone has piled into this dumber, sillier, more consistently funny reprise with an enthusiasm that's infectious, and not in a low-grade medical way". Tom Long of The Detroit News gave the film a B+.

Betsy Sharkey of the Los Angeles Times wrote: "What felt fresh in Peter and Bobby Farrelly's original Dumb and Dumber, with the Carrey-Daniels dense duo channeling the Stooges and Jerry Lewis and something else entirely, feels strangely old-fashioned two decades later". Stephanie Zacharek of The Village Voice wrote that "Dumb and Dumber To is mostly just a kick in the nuts, and not the good kind -- provided there is a good kind". Liam Lacey of The Globe and Mail gave the film two out of four stars and concluded: "Over all, the movie is just funny enough to make you wish it were much better than it is". The Star-Ledger's Stephen Whitty gave the film one and a half out of four stars: "The majority of it isn't just dumb and dumber, or even crude and cruder. At nearly two hours, it's just dull - and duller". David Edelstein of New York magazine wrote: "I reckon four out of every five jokes played to silence at the preview screening. If Dumb and Dumber To were a live comedian, he'd have said, 'Is this an audience or an oil painting?' He'd have left the stage in tears". Wesley Morris of Grantland observed that "the directors Bobby and Peter Farrelly cram the movie with puns and those kinds of sight gags. Almost none of them work". Critic Peter Travers of Rolling Stone gave the film one-and-a-half stars out of four.

For Robbie Collin in The Daily Telegraph it started promisingly:  Mark Kermode, writing in The Observer, "counted a mere three chuckles (one of which I'm fairly sure was unintentional), leaving this several smiles shy of even the widely panned 2003 prequel Dumb and Dumberer: When Harry Met Lloyd". The Guardian Peter Bradshaw found "the movie does deliver some laughs, and the climactic scene in which the two low-IQ boys succeed in infiltrating the equivalent of a TED talk is enjoyably bizarre", but concluded: "It's a rental, rather than a visit to the cinema".

Accolades

References

External links

 
 

2014 films
2010s buddy comedy films
2010s comedy road movies
2010s screwball comedy films
American buddy comedy films
American comedy road movies
American sequel films
Alternative sequel films
2010s English-language films
Dumb and Dumber (franchise)
Films directed by the Farrelly brothers
Films set in Maryland
Films set in Rhode Island
Films set in El Paso, Texas
Films shot in Atlanta
Red Granite Pictures films
New Line Cinema films
Universal Pictures films
American slapstick comedy films
American screwball comedy films
Films with screenplays by the Farrelly brothers
Films with screenplays by John Morris
Films with screenplays by Sean Anders
2014 comedy films
2010s American films
Film controversies in Malaysia